John Collard Cocker (1815 – 27 March 1885), known as Joe Cocker, was an English cricketer who played a single first-class cricket match for a Kent XI in 1842. He was a key figure in the development of cricket in South Australia after emigrating to the colony in the 1840s and was the first curator of the Adelaide Oval.

Early life
Cocker was born at Thurnham near Maidstone in Kent in 1815, the son of Thomas and Mary Cocker. His father was a farmer and John played cricket for sides such as Leeds, Bearsted and Yalding, where he played alongside players such as Alfred Mynn and William Hillyer and Ned Wenman, all of whom were key players in the great Kent sides of the day.

Cocker made his only first-class appearance for a Kent side in 1842 at Lord's just before the formation of the first Kent County Cricket Club. Although he did not play in any other first-class matches he seems to have been highly regarded as a lob bowler. He emigrated to Australia in 1846 and established a public house, the Kentish Arms, at Lower North Adelaide.

South Australia
In South Australia Cocker became an important part of the development of cricket in the colony. He was a "central figure" of the game in Adelaide and considered by the Secretary of the Adelaide Cricket Club as the side's best player at the time. He became the first curator of the ground which became the Adelaide Oval and has been referred to as the "father of South Australian cricket". The Kentish Arms was a venue for cricket-related functions in the city.

Cocker scored what is one of the first recorded centuries in South Australia. In a single wicket challenge match against a seaman he is reported to have scored 109 runs, dismissing his opponent for less than 20 runs in return.

Family
Cocker married Harriet Foster at Newington in Surrey in 1842 before emigrating. The couple had two sons and six daughters. His sister, Mary, is believed to have married fellow immigrant Lewis Hollingworth, another Kent cricketer whom Cocker played alongside in club cricket and for West Kent. Cocker died at Lower North Adelaide in 1885 aged 70.

References

External links

1815 births
1885 deaths
English cricketers
Kent cricketers
People from the Borough of Maidstone